The Krasnogorsk-3 (Красногорск-3) is a spring-wound 16mm mirror-reflex movie camera designed and manufactured in the USSR by KMZ. A total of 105,435 Krasnogorsk-3 cameras were produced between 1971 and 1993.

It was one of the most popular 16mm movie cameras in Eastern Europe, where it made a prominent appearance in Krzysztof Kieślowski's 1979 film Camera Buff, and continues to enjoy considerable popularity in the West. Director Spike Lee shot parts of his film Get on the Bus with a Krasnogorsk-3.

Technical information 
The Krasnogorsk-3 uses standard  load of 16mm film (single or double-perforation). There is no provision for an external magazine. There are two different lens mounts used on the Krasnogorsk-3: the M42×1 lens mount, and a Russian bayonet mount. The stock lens is the f/1.9 17–69 mm zoom lens Meteor-5-1, considered by many to be a quality optic. The M42 screw-mount allows for the use of widely available lenses from 35 mm still cameras such as Asahi Pentax Takumar lenses. Cameras which have been modified from the original standard 16mm (double-perforartion) to accept Super 16 (single-perforation) film may experience vignetting at the widest zoom setting with stock Meteor lenses.

The camera has a single pulldown claw and no registration pin. At 24 frame/s, the Krasnogorsk-3 will run for about 25 seconds on a full wind. Film speed is adjustable from 8 frame/s to 48 frame/s; however, many cameras are capable of functioning at higher frame rates (upwards of 60 fps) if the adjusting dial is turned beyond the 48 fps indicating mark. A single-frame release at the back of the Krasnogorsk-3 allows for animation and other single-frame applications.

The PX640 battery required to power the internal light meter is no longer sold due to its mercury content. Using an alkaline replacement will not give accurate results due to the differing voltage and discharge slope of alkaline cells. However, a zinc–air battery will function properly with an appropriate adapter.

See also 

 Krasnogorsk-2
 Bolex
 Filmo

References

External links
 Krasnogorsk-3 Manual and technical information
 Krasnogorsk images with modifications
 Krasnogorsk-3 test shots and specifications
   Soviet cameras produced from 1960-1993
  Krasnogorsk-2 original User Manual
  Krasnogorsk-3 original User Manual
  Krasnogorsk-4 original User Manual
  About "K"-line 16 mm movie cameras (Soviet space program)

Movie cameras
Soviet cameras